Federico García Vigil (5 January 1941 – 27 May 2020) was a Uruguayan composer and conductor. He was the conductor of the Montevideo Philharmonic Orchestra from 1994 to 2008.

References

1941 births
2020 deaths
Uruguayan composers
Uruguayan conductors (music)
Uruguayan male musicians
Male composers
Male conductors (music)
20th-century composers
20th-century conductors (music)
20th-century male musicians
21st-century composers
21st-century conductors (music)
21st-century male musicians